Niantaga is a rural commune in the Cercle of Koutiala in the Sikasso Region of southern Mali. The commune covers an area of 258 square kilometers and includes 4 villages. In the 2009 census it had a population of 7,574. The village of Koloni, the administrative centre (chef-lieu) of the commune, is 45 km north-northeast of Koutiala.

References

External links
.

Communes of Sikasso Region